Culiseta longiareolata is a species of mosquito.

Distribution
This species can be found in the following countries:

Albania
Botswana
Bulgaria
Cyprus
Djibouti
Egypt
Ethiopia
France
Greece
Hungary
India
Iran
Iraq
Israel
Italy
Jordan
Lebanon
Lesotho
Mauritania
Morocco
Namibia
Pakistan
Portugal
Romania
Russia
Slovakia
Somalia
South Africa
Spain
Sudan
Syria
Tajikistan
Tunisia
Turkey
Ukraine
Yemen

References

 
Culicinae
Insects described in 1838